Tara Nicole Weyr is an American television director.

Directing credits
Billions
Desperate Housewives
Devious Maids
Fear the Walking Dead
The Flash
The Good Doctor
Lucifer
The Night Shift
Once Upon a Time
Revenge

References

External links

American television directors
American women television directors
Living people
Place of birth missing (living people)
Year of birth missing (living people)